The Municipalities of Colombia are decentralized subdivisions of the Republic of Colombia.   Municipalities make up most of the departments of Colombia with 1,122 municipalities (municipios). Each one of them is led by a mayor (alcalde) elected by popular vote and represents the maximum executive government official at a municipality level under the mandate of the governor of their department which is a representative of all municipalities in the department; municipalities are grouped to form departments.

The municipalities of Colombia are also grouped in an association called the Federación Colombiana de Municipios (Colombian Federation of Municipalities), which functions as a union under the private law and under the constitutional right to free association to defend their common interests.

Categories 
Conforming to the law 1551/12 that modified the sixth article of the law 136/94  the municipalities have the categories listed below:

Amazonas Department

The Department of Amazonas is formed by 2 municipalities which are Leticia and Puerto Nariño; and by "department corregimientos" which is a special combined functions between a presidential power and a corregimiento. The reason for this classification is that the large territory is mostly inhospitable, inhabited only by indigenous peoples and within the Amazon rainforest.

Municipalities
 Leticia
 Puerto Nariño

Antioquia Department

Arauca Department

Atlántico Department

Bogotá, Capital District

Bogotá is divided into localities (localidades):

Bolívar Department

Boyacá Department

Caldas Department

Caquetá Department

Casanare Department

Cauca Department

Cesar Department

Chocó Department

Córdoba Department

Cundinamarca Department

La Guajira Department

 Albania
 Barrancas
 Dibulla
 Distracción
 El Molino
 Fonseca
 Hatonuevo
 La Jagua del Pilar
 Maicao
 Manaure
 Riohacha
 San Juan del Cesar
 Uribia
 Urumita
 Villanueva

Guainía Department

 Barranco Minas
 Cacahual
 Inirida
 La Guadalupe
 Morichal Nuevo
 Pana Pana
 Puerto Colombia
 San Felipe

Guaviare Department

 Calamar
 El Retorno
 Miraflores
 San José del Guaviare

Huila Department

Magdalena Department

Meta Department

Nariño Department

Norte de Santander Department

Putumayo Department

Quindío Department

 Armenia
 Buenavista
 Calarcá
 Circasia
 Córdoba
 Filandia
 Génova
 La Tebaida
 Montenegro
 Pijao
 Quimbaya
 Salento

Risaralda Department

 Apía
 Balboa
 Belén de Umbría
 Dosquebradas
 Guática
 La Celia
 La Virginia
 Marsella
 Mistrató
 Pereira
 Pueblo Rico
 Quinchía
 Santa Rosa de Cabal
 Santuario

San Andrés and Providencia Department

 Providencia and Santa Catalina Islands 
 San Andrés

Santander Department

Sucre Department

Tolima Department

Valle del Cauca Department

Vaupés Department

Municipalities
 Caruru
 Mitú
 Taraira

Department Corregimientos
 Pacoa
 Papunahua
 Yavarate

Municipal Corregimientos
 Acaricuara
 Villa Fátima

Vichada Department

 Cumaribo (including the former department corregimientos of San José de Ocune and Santa Rita)
 La Primavera
 Puerto Carreño
 Santa Rosalía

Districts
 1954 Special District of Bogotá
 1991: Capital District of Bogotá, Industrial and Portuarial District of Barranquilla, Historical, Cultural and Touristic District of Santa Marta and Cultural and Touristic District of Cartagena
 2007: Historical and Cultural District of Tunja, Special Industrial, Portuarial, Biodiverse and Ecotouristic, District of Buenaventura, Special, Ecotouristic, Historical and Universitarian District of Popayán, Special Portuarial District of Turbo, Special Border and Touristic District of Cúcuta, Special Industrial, Portuarial, Biodiverse and Ecotouristic, District of Tumaco

References

External links
  Colombian Federation of Municipalities
  Libre University Municipalities of Colombia
  National Estatistics Department (DANE) 2005 Census on the 1,119 municipalities of Colombia

 
Subdivisions of Colombia